The London and South Western Railway T1 class was a class of fifty 0-4-4T steam tank locomotives designed for suburban passenger work by William Adams and built between 1888 and 1896.

History
The class were numbered 1–20, 61–80 and 358–367. In typical London and South Western Railway fashion, they reused the numbers of retired or duplicated engines. The class remained largely intact until the 1930s, being scheduled to be withdrawn by 1940, however due to the Second World War a few remained in traffic (around eight examples) until the early British Railways years, the final one (30007) being withdrawn in May 1951.

Possible Revival
No complete T1 locomotives were saved for preservation, however, a boiler and smokebox from a withdrawn locomotive was found in a factory in Essex back in the 1980s and was subsequently purchased for use on a 'new' T1 locomotive. Since September 2004, this boiler has been stored on the Avon Valley Railway.

References

T01
0-4-4T locomotives
Railway locomotives introduced in 1888
Scrapped locomotives
Standard gauge steam locomotives of Great Britain